Shahril Jantan (born 20 April 1980) is a Singaporean retired footballer who played as a goalkeeper for S.League clubs with Geylang United, Singapore Armed Forces and Home United.

Club career
Shahril started his football career as a 16-year-old for Geylang United for the under 16 team. He eventually progressed up the ranks to the under 18 team in 1997 and Prime League team in 1998. He was also registered as a S-league player in the 1998 squad as the no. 3 goalie behind David Lee and Shahri Rahim. Shahril remained as the no. 3 in 1999 and eventually moved a notch up as no. 2 in 2000 behind German goalkeeper Lutz Pfannenstiel.

In Nov 2000, Shahril and Lionel Lewis was sent to Arsenal Football Club in London for a five-week training attachment where both of them rubbed shoulders with some of the top players in the premiership. They were training with the likes of Ashley Cole, Matthew Upson, David Bentley and Jermaine Pennant, who were from the reserve team and the youth team respectively.

In Shahril 1st full season in the S-League in 2001, he won his first S-League Championship medal with Geylang United after a mixed season, sharing playing time with Lionel Lewis.

In 2002, Shahril moved to SAFFC as he was serving his National Service,a year where Shahril played 1 of his best season helping SAFFC winning the S-League Championship, his second winners medal two years running. The same year, Shahril edged out long-time custodian Rezal Hassan, taking the national number one jersey.

He was nominated for the Young Player of The Year award but lost to eventual winner Noh Alam Shah. He was also named Straits Times Goalkeeper of the Year award for 2002 season. The national serviceman was a formidable presence in goal that year.

Shahril returned to Geylang United for the 2004 and 2005 season to finish the remainder of his contract where he had a disappointing season before moving to SAFFC in 2006.

Shahril helped SAFFC to win the 2006,2007,2008 and recently the 2009 S-League Championship and the 2007, 2008, 2012 Singapore Cup, his 6th S-League winners medal in 9 full season as a professional. He recently won another Singapore Cup Trophy with his current club Home United Football Club .

Shahril was named the Warriors' Player of the Year for 2009 season.

International career
In 1998, Shahril got his first national team call-up as an 18-year-old, against Brunei. With injuries to first choice keeper Rezal Hassan and the unavailability of others, Shahril got his chance, thanks to then Head Coach Vincent Subramaniam.

His full international debut came against Uruguay on 21 May 2002.

The 2002 Tiger Cup would prove a disappointing end to what should have been a memorable year for Shahril, and the young keeper bore the brunt of much criticism. His last National team call-up was after being in the Singapore Squad that won the now defunct 2004 Tiger Cup.

Life After Football
Shahril graduated with a bachelor's degree in sports management from the University of Wolverhampton back in 2013 while still playing professional football. Upon his retirement at the end of the 2015 S-League season, Shahril worked as an Assistant Project Manager at RED CARD Global. In July 2016, Shahril joined Students Care Services in the Social Service Sector as a Programme Executive. Shahril is currently with the same organization which is now called SHINE Children & Youth Services holding the designation of a Senior Social Work Associate.

Shahril is also actively coaching goalkeepers during his free time and has worked at various Football Academies and Football Clubs like ANZA, Turf City Academy, St Michael's Soccer Academy, AC Milan Academy, Brazilian Jericho Academy, Tampines Rovers Football Club and Geylang International Football Club.

Honours

Club
Geylang United
S.League: 2001

Singapore Armed Forces
S.League: 2002, 2006, 2007, 2008, 2009
Singapore Cup: 2007, 2008, 2012

Home United
Singapore Cup: 2013

International
Singapore
ASEAN Football Championship: 2004

Individual
Straits Times Goalkeeper of the Year: 2002
SAFFC-Warriors' Player of the Year: 2009
Yeo's People's Choice Award: 2010

References

External links

safwarriors.com.sg
safwarriors.com.sg
kallangroar.com
goal.com

1980 births
Living people
Singaporean footballers
Singapore international footballers
Warriors FC players
Association football goalkeepers
Geylang International FC players
Home United FC players
Singapore Premier League players